Felix Böhni (born 14 February 1958) is a Swiss athlete. He competed in the men's pole vault at the 1980 Summer Olympics and the 1984 Summer Olympics, finishing seventh in 1984.  While competing for San Jose State University, he was the 1983 NCAA Champion in the pole vault.

References

External links
 

1958 births
Living people
Track and field athletes from San Jose, California
Athletes (track and field) at the 1980 Summer Olympics
Athletes (track and field) at the 1984 Summer Olympics
Swiss male pole vaulters
Olympic athletes of Switzerland
Place of birth missing (living people)